The North African Cup is an old football competition organized in North Africa since 1930. It was dissolved after the 1956 edition, due to the independence of Morocco and Tunisia.
After the independence of Morocco and Tunisia from French, three Algerian leagues remained participating in the cup, Algiers, Constantine and Oran. It was decided to establish another competition called the Algerian Cup under the tutelage of the French Football Federation.

Winners of the North African Cup

Winners by team

* Match not played

Winners by league

In the 1955–56 edition, two teams from the League of Oran went to the final; however it was not played. So normally the League of Oran is ranked in the first place with 8 winners and four runners-up.

Notes and references

Notes

References

External links
The Rec.Sport.Soccer Statistics Foundation

Defunct international club association football competitions in Africa
Recurring sporting events established in 1930
Recurring sporting events disestablished in 1956